The Connecticut Cougars were a semi-professional ice hockey team in North Eastern Hockey League (NEHL).  The team was originally the Poughkeepsie Panthers and was based in Poughkeepsie, New York.  After very low attendance in the first few games in Poughkeepsie, the team was to be relocated to Connecticut and renamed the Connecticut Cougars, but negotiations with an arena broke down and the Cougars finished as a road team for the remainder of the season. Panthers Head Coach Dan Stewart replaced Jason Gerhard when the team was to be relocated.

Regular season records

External links

North Eastern Hockey League teams
Ice hockey teams in New York (state)